Spoor can mean:

 Spoor (animal), anything that shows signs of an animal
 Spoor (comics)
 Spoor (album), an album by Thin White Rope
 Spoor (film), a 2017 Polish film